This page is about the Puerto Rican baseball player. For the American doctor convicted of two double murders in Omaha, Nebraska, see Anthony Garcia (serial killer).

Anthony García (born January 4, 1992) is a Puerto Rican professional baseball outfielder for the Mariachis de Guadalajara of the Mexican League. He was drafted by the St. Louis Cardinals in the 18th round of the 2009 Major League Baseball draft.

Career

St. Louis Cardinals
García made his professional debut in 2009 with the Gulf Coast Cardinals. He played for the Puerto Rico national baseball team at the 2015 Pan American Games. He was added to the 40-man roster on November 5, 2015. During the 2016 season, he split time between the Springfield Cardinals and the Memphis Redbirds. He posted a .238 batting average with 11 home runs and 43 RBIs between both clubs. In 2017, he once again split time between Springfield and Memphis, where he batted .282 with 16 home runs and 72 RBIs. On April 24, 2017, García was outrighted off of the 40-man roster.

Oakland Athletics
He elected free agency on November 6, 2017, and signed a minor league contract with the Oakland Athletics on November 28. In 132 games he hit .254 with 25 HR and 91 RBI in Triple-A. He elected free agency on November 2, 2018.

San Francisco Giants
On November 29, 2018, Garcia signed a minor league deal with the San Francisco Giants. He did not make the team and was assigned to Triple-A Sacramento River Cats to start the season. He elected free agency following the season.

Los Angeles Dodgers
On December 19, 2019, García signed a minor league deal with the Los Angeles Dodgers. On July 11, 2020, he was added to the Dodgers' 60-man player pool. García did not play in a game in 2020 due to the cancellation of the minor league season because of the COVID-19 pandemic. He became a free agent on November 2, 2020.

Kane County Cougars
On March 19, 2021, García signed with the Kane County Cougars of the American Association of Professional Baseball. However, he left the Cougars on April 23 without having played a game for them.

Mariachis de Guadalajara
On April 23, 2021, García signed with the Mariachis de Guadalajara of the Mexican League. He appeared in 36 games for the Mariachis, hitting .316/.428/.623 with 9 home runs, 26 RBI, and four stolen bases.

In 2022, García played in 47 games for Guadalajara, slashing .346/.467/.642 with 13 home runs, 43 RBI, and 6 stolen bases. On June 16, 2022, he suffered an ankle injury during a game against the Algodoneros de Unión Laguna and was later ruled out for the rest of the season.

On February 17, 2023, García re-signed with Guadalajara for the 2023 season.

References

External links

Living people
1992 births
Baseball outfielders
Minor league baseball players
Gulf Coast Cardinals players
Johnson City Cardinals players
Gigantes de Carolina players
Quad Cities River Bandits players
Springfield Cardinals players
Memphis Redbirds players
Leones del Caracas players
Puerto Rican expatriate baseball players in Venezuela
Nashville Sounds players
Baseball players at the 2015 Pan American Games
Pan American Games competitors for Puerto Rico
People from Carolina, Puerto Rico
Puerto Rican baseball players
Mariachis de Guadalajara players
Puerto Rican expatriate baseball players in Mexico